The General Directorate of Security or Turkish Police Service is the national civilian police force responsible for law enforcement of the Republic of Turkey, which is affiliated with the Ministry of Interior.

Structure
In the provinces, it operates under the command of governors and district governors. Civil administrators are responsible for the security and well being of towns and districts. The Turkish National Police (TNP) operates within the network of the civil administration system and carries out its duties under the command and control of the civil authority. Town governors and heads of district administrations supervise the force.

The TNP is organised as follows:
Central organisation
Provincial organisation
81 Directorates of Provincial Police
751 Police Directorates of Towns affiliated to Provinces
22 Border Gates Police Directorates
18 Free-Zone police stations
834 police stations in 81 Provinces

Ranks

Function and mission

In general, the police's realm of responsibility is geographically located inside the municipal boundaries in Turkey. In accordance with the “Law on Duties and Powers of the Police”, the duties of the Police are to:

provide public peace and order
provide security of persons and properties
detect, arrest and transfer both offenders and case evidence to the appropriate judicial bodies
perform duties apart from the administrative such as judicial assigned by laws, regulations and government acts
prevent crime in order to protect public safety and order

The TNP also has political duties such as the protection of the integrity of the state and the preservation of constitutional order. Furthermore, the TNP has administrative functions, including preventive, protective and assistance duties.

A Traffic Services Department, a Highways Traffic Security Council and a Supreme Board for Highway Security have been established in order to deal with traffic problems more effectively.

The TNP hosts the Istanbul Conference on Democracy and Global Security.

Units 
All Turkish police officers wear navy-blue uniforms and caps.

Patrol cars can be identified by their unique blue-white design and the writing “Polis” (Turkish for 'Police') on the side doors and hood.

Commissioners and police chiefs wear silver stars rank on their shoulders and police directors wear gold stars.

Some well-known police units in Turkey are: 
 Martılar bike patrol units
 Yunuslar motorcycle units
 Şahinler motorcycle units of the traffic department.
 TOMA armored water cannon designed for riot control.
 Çevik Kuvvet who handle riot control cases.
 Özel Harekat() which is the special response unit of the directorate (quite like the American SWAT or the German GSG 9).
 Karşı Atak Timi close protection service for the president.
Aviation Department

Training
The TNP receives two categories of training, the first being in-service training provided by the Department of Education operating directly under the General Directorate of Security; whereas pre-profession training is provided by the Police Academy. The Police Academy offers five different training programs:

Police Schools (2 years)
Police Training Centers (8 months)
Police Chiefs Training Center (1 year)
Security Sciences Institute
Higher Level Management Training

There are other educational institutions that give expert in-service training, such as the Turkish International Academy Against Drugs and Organized Crime and the Crime Investigation and Research Education Center.

Equipment

Handguns
 Yavuz 16
 Sarsılmaz Kılınç 2000
 Girsan MC 28 SA
 TP9 SF Elite-S
 SAR 9 METE

Shotguns

 Sarsılmaz Cobra & Baba
 USAS-12

Submachine guns
 Heckler & Koch MP5
 SAR 109T
 Uzi

Assault/Battle Rifle

 MPT 76
 MPT 55
 SAR 223T/P
 HK 33E
 HK G3
 AKM
 M16
 M4
 HK417A2
 Galil
 SIG516

Riot control
 FN 303
 Milkor MGL

Machine Guns

 Canik M2 QCB
 M60E6
 M249SAW
 MAG58
 LM8
 KMG556

Sniper Rifles

 SVD Dragunov
 LMT MWS 308
 IMI Galatz
 PCL-54C
 Steyr SSG 69PI
 Steyr SSG 08
 Accuracy International AX50

Grenade Launchers

 M203
 Penn Arms GL40
 Milkor M320A1

Vehicles

Boats

 Şehit Eren Bülbül- Ares 35 FPB
 ASBOT KN-35
 57 patrol boats

See also
 List of Chiefs of the General Directorate of Security
 Istanbul Chief of Police

References

External links

General Directorate of Security 
Directorate of Security, Foreign Relations Department
Police Association
Uniforms of the General Directorate of Security
https://twitter.com/EmniyetGM

Government agencies with year of establishment missing
Law enforcement in Turkey